Ana Paula Polegatch (born 21 October 1988) is a Brazilian road cyclist, who rides for Brazilian amateur team UniFunvic–Gelog–Pindamonhangaba. She won the Brazilian National Time Trial Championships in 2014, 2017, 2021 and 2022.

Major results
Source: 

2012
 National Road Championships
3rd Time trial
4th Road race
2014
 1st  Time trial, National Road Championships
2015
 2nd  Time trial, Military World Games
 2nd Time trial, National Road Championships
 3rd Overall Tour Femenino de San Luis
 4th Time trial, Pan American Road Championships
 5th Time trial, Pan American Games
2016
 1st Overall Torneio de Veräo
 1st 1º de Maio em Indaiatuba
 National Road Championships
2nd Road race
2nd Time trial
2017
 1st  Madison, National Track Championships
 National Road Championships
1st  Time trial
2nd Road race
 2nd Gran Cup de Ciclismo
 2nd 1º de Maio em Indaiatuba
2018
 2nd Time trial, National Road Championships
 2nd Overall Tour Internacional Femenino de Uruguay
1st Stages 2 (ITT) & 4
 7th Time trial, Pan American Road Championships
2019
 3rd Time trial, National Road Championships
 3rd Chabany Race
 6th Time trial, Pan American Road Championships
2021
 National Road Championships
1st  Time trial
1st  Road race
 3rd Team pursuit, National Track Championships
2022
 1st  Time trial, National Road Championships
 5th Time trial, South American Games

References

External links
 
 

1988 births
People from Guarapuava
Brazilian female cyclists
Brazilian road racing cyclists
Living people
Cyclists at the 2015 Pan American Games
Pan American Games competitors for Brazil
Sportspeople from Paraná (state)
21st-century Brazilian women